WWOT (100.1 FM) is the Top 40 music formatted radio station in Altoona, Pennsylvania.  The station is owned by Seven Mountains Media and is related to Hot 92.1 in Johnstown, Pennsylvania. The station has an ERP of 3,000 watts.

History of the 100.1 frequency

As WVAM-FM
The station first began airing on May 22, 1979 as WVAM-FM and was owned by Blair County Broadcasters Incorporated. WVAM-FM was initially an automated Drake-Chenault Top-40 station until 1980. Top-40 initially aired on WVAM AM 1430 before the launch of WVAM-FM. When the FM station was launched, WVAM AM was changed to a country format.

Sale to Phyldel Communications
In 1979, Blair County Broadcasters Inc., the owners of WVAM-FM and WVAM, were charged with engaging in fraudulent billing practices by the FCC and order to either sell the stations or facing a hearing. The fraudulent charges occurred with billing advertisers. The two stations were sold to Phyldel Communications Corp. in September 1980 for $913,000.

1980 studio fire
In April 1980, a fire occurred at the stations main office at West Albert Drive. The station was silenced for a day due to the fire. When returning on air, WVAM had to use barrowed equipment at a lesser power of 20 watts instead of the typical 3,000. New transmitters allowed the station to return to 3,000 watts on May 5, 1980. Operations were moved to a trailer parked on station grounds until May 6, 1980. The fire was caused by a faulty ballast in a fluorescent light fixture and resulted in an estimated $225,000 in damage The new equipment resulted in technical problems at the stations temporarily location, which lead to WVAM moving operations to avoid radio interference.

WPRR-FM
On December 26, 1980, the station changed call sign to WPRR and changed format from automated Top 40 to an AOR format. WPRR changed formats again in the mid-1980s to an automated Contemporary hit radio. By  1986, a full on-air staff was hired and automation was no longer used.

One of its most popular features in the 1990s was the morning show with Tommy Edwards and Danice Bell, which aired every weekday.  Other popular personalities to pass through WPPR during the 1980s and 1990s were Scott St. John, Dave McCall, Steve Hilton, Bob McCarty, Dave Austin, J.B. Savage, Kristen Fox, Chad Bender, Jim Hatch, Darrell Ray, Hollywood John Harlow, Doug Taylor (Doug Yoel) and Rich Dennis.

In 1999, WPRR was known as "Today's Hit Music 100.1 WPRR" and had a slogan of "Serving all of Central Pennsylvania: Altoona, State College." In 2000, WPRR was rated second in Altoona with a market share of 11.5.

WPRR was known as "Power 100" in the 2000s and remained a CHR station until its call letters were changed in 2005.

WWOT

The station changed their call sign to WWOT on March 15, 2005. Shortly after changing their call letters, WWOT changed their name to "Hot 100" and changed formats to Top 40.

Sale to Seven Mountains Media
It was announced on October 12, 2022 that Forever Media is selling 34 stations, including WWOT and the entire Altoona cluster, to State College-based Seven Mountains Media for $17.3 million. The deal closed on January 2, 2023.

Conflict with 100.1 in Romney, West Virginia
As one travels southbound on Interstate 99 towards Bedford, Pennsylvania, WWOT's signal will start to conflict with WVMD in Romney, West Virginia, a Country station. Romney is located near the intersection of US 220, US 50 and West Virginia Route 28.

Temperature inversions can cause FM signals to travel farther, but the two stations are operating within Federal Communications Commission guidelines.

References

External links
 
 

WOT
Contemporary hit radio stations in the United States
Radio stations established in 1954
1954 establishments in Pennsylvania